Patty Fendick and Jill Hetherington were the defending champions of the doubles event at the 1989 Virginia Slims of Los Angeles tennis tournament but lost in the quarterfinals to Elizabeth Smylie and Janine Tremelling.

Martina Navratilova and Wendy Turnbull won the final 5–2 after Mary Joe Fernández and Claudia Kohde-Kilsch were forced to retire.

Seeds
Champion seeds are indicated in bold text while text in italics indicates the round in which those seeds were eliminated. The top four seeded teams received byes into the second round.

Draw

Final

Top half

Bottom half

External links
 1989 Virginia Slims of Los Angeles Doubles Draw

1989
1989 WTA Tour